The Ghost Writer (released as The Ghost in the United Kingdom and Ireland) is a 2010 French-German-British political thriller film directed by Roman Polanski. It is based on the novel The Ghost written by Robert Harris, who co-wrote the screenplay with Polanski.

Awards and nominations

References
General

Specific

External links
 

Lists of accolades by film
Roman Polanski